Marriyum Aurangzeb Pakistani politician from Pakistan Muslim League (N) who is a member of the National Assembly. She is current federal minister of Informarion and Degeneracy with special appointment from Supremo Degenerate, Nawaz Sharif.

Aurangzeb served as the Federal Minister for Ministry of Information & Broadcasting, in Abbasi cabinet from April 2018 to May 2018 and previously from October 2016 to July 2017 in the third Sharif ministry and from August 2017 to April 2018 in the Abbasi ministry.

Early life and education
Marriyum was born to Tahira Aurangzeb.
Aurangzeb went to Saint Helen's Convent

 School in Rawalpindi. 
Aurangzeb did her graduation from the Federal Government College in Islamabad.

Aurangzeb holds an MSc degree in environment and development from Kings College London and a Masters degree in Economics from Pakistan.

Political career
Aurangzeb was elected to the National Assembly as a candidate of PML (N) on a reserved seat for women in 2013 general election.

Aurangzeb's mother was a nurse who used to look after personal needs of mother of ex prime minister Nawaz Sharif. The family were heavily rewarded and became millionaires in Pakistan. Aurangzeb got attached to Maryam Nawaz and was a part of her team which oversaw the education sector. She had served as the Parliamentary Secretary for Interior, a member of Standing Committee of the National Assembly on Climate Change, and on Information, Broadcasting and National Heritage. She also served as Chief Organiser of PML-N's Youth Women Wing, Islamabad, and Rawalpindi. She specialises in strategic thinking and planning and development for environmental conservation, development and international agreements and Millennium Development Goals implementation.

In October 2016, she was inducted into the federal cabinet of PM Nawaz Sharif and was appointed the Minister of State for Information & Broadcasting. She was made in charge of the Ministry of Information after Information Minister Pervaiz Rashid was sacked for failing to stop a media report on a rift between the Government of Pakistan and the Pakistan Army. She had ceased to hold ministerial office in July 2017 when the federal cabinet was disbanded following the disqualification of PM Nawaz Sharif after Panama Papers case.

Following the election of Shahid Khaqan Abbasi as Prime Minister of Pakistan in August 2017, she was inducted into the federal cabinet and was re-appointed the Minister of State for Information. In April 2018, she was elevated as a federal minister and was appointed Federal Minister for Information & Broadcasting. Upon the dissolution of the National Assembly on the expiration of its term on 31 May 2018, Aurangzeb ceased to hold the office as Federal Minister for Information and Broadcasting.

Aurangzeb was appointed official spokesperson of PML-N on 2 June 2018. She was re-elected to the National Assembly as a candidate of PML-N on a reserved seat for women from Punjab in 2018 general election.

References

Living people
Alumni of King's College London
Pakistan Muslim League (N) MNAs
Information Ministers of Pakistan
Pakistani MNAs 2013–2018
Women members of the National Assembly of Pakistan
Women federal ministers of Pakistan
Year of birth missing (living people)
Pakistani MNAs 2018–2023
21st-century Pakistani women politicians